The Isfara ballistic missile attacks — comprise two separate ballistic missile attacks on the city of Isfara, Tajikistan, in September 2022, carried out by the Armed Forces of the Kyrgyz Republic during the 2022 Kyrgyzstan–Tajikistan clashes.

On September 16, 2022, after the shelling of the Tajik city of Isfara by the Kyrgyz Army, 4 people were killed in an ambulance

On September 18, after shelling by the Kyrgyz army, 5 members of one family and 2 children were killed.

Kyrgyz response 
The Border Service of Kyrgyzstan, first accusing Tajikistan of shelling the village of Pasky-Aryk, began retaliatory shelling of Tajik settlements such as Khistevarz, Khojai-Alo, Kummazor, Ovchikalacha, Surkh, Isfara, Lakkon, Somion, Bobojon-Gafurov, Chorbog, Kanidabam, Bogiston, Buston.

USA response 
On November 24, the US Department of Defense delivered humanitarian aid to Isfara to victims of shelling

References

History of Tajikistan